Holbury is an Iron Age hill fort situated close to Holbeton in Devon, England. The fort is situated on a hilltop east of the Village approximately 95 metres above sea level overlooking the Erme Estuary.

References

Hill forts in Devon